Elena Panaritis is a  Greek economist and former member of the Greek Parliament.

Early life and studies
Elena Panaritis was born in Athens, Greece. She studied Economics at the American College of Greece, graduating with a BA in 1989, and went on to the University of Bologna Italy, to get her Master's in International Economics, in 1990. In 1992, she received a Master's in International Economics and European Studies from Johns Hopkins University's School of Advanced International Studies and in 2003 a Master's in Business Administration from INSEAD.

World Bank
Panaritis started working in the World Bank, Washington, DC, in 1991, as a regional analyst. As the bank's Deputy Country Officer for Peru, she supervised the state's privatization and debt restructuring programs. She also assisted in the drafting of conditions agreed with Latin American countries, such as Brazil, Peru, and Venezuela, for structural adjustment lending, fiscal adjustments and privatization.

As a Public/Private Sector Management Specialist at the World Bank, Panaritis worked, among other programs, on the property rights reforms in the Philippines, and on judicial reforms in Trinidad and Tobago, and designed the conditions for a $100 million loan to Morocco.

Academia
From 2001 onwards, Panaritis has been a visiting lecturer at the Wharton School of the University of Pennsylvania on the subject of housing rights.

Politics
The moderate socialist PASOK party nominated Panaritis in an electable position in its candidates lists for the 2009 general elections, and she was elected member of the Greek Parliament on 4 October 2009. She was not a candidate in the 2012 general election, in which PASOK lost some 30 percentage points in the voting.

In May 2015, during the still ongoing Greek financial crisis, then Minister of Finance Yanis Varoufakis appointed Panaritis as Greece's representative to the International Monetary Fund. Her appointment drew criticism from members of the government and the ruling Syriza party and on 1 June 2015 she resigned from the position.

Author
She has authored numerous books and articles on economics.

References

External links
 'Prosperity Unbound' official website

Living people
Greek women economists
PASOK politicians
Greek MPs 2009–2012
Greek non-fiction writers
21st-century Greek women politicians
University of Bologna alumni
Johns Hopkins University alumni
Harvard Kennedy School alumni
INSEAD alumni
Academic staff of INSEAD
Wharton School of the University of Pennsylvania faculty
Johns Hopkins University faculty
Year of birth missing (living people)
Politicians from Athens